A headstander is any of several species of South American fish, including Anostomus ternetzi, Anostomus anostomus (family Anostomidae) and members of genus Chilodus from the family Chilodontidae. The name derives from their habit of swimming at a 45° angle, head pointed downwards, as if "standing on their heads".

About

The headstander is a fairly large fish. They are predominantly found in shallow streams with strong currents and a lot of algae, which they feed off of. They come from South America and prefer slightly acidic water with medium hardness. The headstander will eat almost any kind of food, but mostly enjoy hair algae. Headstanders have also been called Ternetz's anostomus. The headstander will reach up to approximately 4 3/4 inches in length and is very active. They are very sensitive to shadows, like to jump, and tend to be slightly aggressive. They are most peaceful when kept as a single specimen or in groups of more than 6.

References

Fish of South America
Fish common names